Shades is a historical novel written by Marguerite Poland. The book was first published in 1993 by Penguin Books. The story centers around the early parts of South Africa's history in the Eastern Cape.

Plot 

The plot revolves around a family, the Farboroughs, who lived in the Eastern Cape of South Africa in the early 1900s. It is set in a small Eastern Cape community known as St Matthias (St Matthew).  The main protagonist is Walter Brownley who lived in the early parts of South Africa's war against Britain. Several racial issues are tackled in the book in regard to black African exploitation as seen on the mines of the Highveld.

Characters 

Charles Farborough - Head priest at St Matthias
Emily Farborough - wife of Father Charles
Crispin Farborough - son of Emily and Charles Farborough
Frances Farborough - daughter of Emily and Charles Farborough
Benedict Matiwane - Mr and Mrs Farborough's "adopted" son
Walter Brownley - protagonist of story
Victor Drake - "cousin" of Crispin and Frances
Nowasha - the maid
Helmina Smythe - tutor of Crispin and Frances
Sonwabo

Locations 
The entire story takes place in South Africa.
 St Matthias, Eastern Cape
 Mbokothwe, Eastern Cape
 King Williams Town, Eastern Cape
 Grahamstown, Eastern Cape
 Johannesburg, Transvaal province now Gauteng

See also
St. Matthew's High School, Keiskammahoek

Notes and references

 

1993 novels
Historical novels
20th-century South African novels
Novels set in South Africa
Fiction set in the 1900s
Eastern Cape